National Route 232 is a national highway of Japan connecting Wakkanai and Rumoi in Hokkaido, with a total length of 184.8 km (114.83 mi).

References

National highways in Japan
Roads in Hokkaido